Parnara is a genus of butterflies in the family Hesperiidae, the skippers. They are native to Asia, Africa and Australia.

These are small, brown skippers that have thin, translucent spots on their wings.

Species
Species include:

Parnara amalia (Semper, [1879])
Parnara apostata (Snellen, [1880])
P. a. apostata Sumatra, Malay Peninsula, S.Burma, Java, Bali
P. a. andra Evans, 1949 Borneo
P. a. debdasi Chiba & Eliot, 1991 Nepal
P. a. hulsei Devyatkin & Monastyrskii, 1999 South Yunnan
Parnara bada (Moore, 1878) – Ceylon swift
Parnara batta Evans, 1949 Southeast China 
Parnara ganga Evans, 1937 – continental swift
Parnara guttata (Bremer & Grey, [1852]) – straight swift
Parnara kawazoei Chiba & Eliot, 1991 Philippines, Borneo, Sulawesi
Parnara monasi (Trimen, 1889) – water watchman
Parnara naso (Fabricius, 1798)
Parnara ogasawarensis Matsumura, 1906 Bonin Islands (Japan)

Biology 
The larvae feed on Gramineae including Bambusa, Oryza, Apluda, Bothriochloa, Colocasia, Imperata, Microstegium, Zea, Saccharum

References

External links
Parnara. Butterflies and Moths of the World. Natural History Museum.
Images representing Parnara at Consortium for the Barcode of Life

Hesperiinae
Hesperiidae genera